George G. Graham (born September 23, 1931) is an American politician who served as chairman of the South Carolina Republican Party from 1980 to 1986.

References

1931 births
Living people
South Carolina Republicans
State political party chairs of South Carolina